Stempellinella is a genus of European non-biting midges in the subfamily Chironominae of the bloodworm family Chironomidae.

Chironomidae
Diptera of Europe